José Manuel Álvarez, an Argentine politician, was Governor of Córdoba from 17 May 1901 to 17 May 1904.

References

Governors of Córdoba Province, Argentina
Year of birth missing
Place of birth missing
Year of death missing